The Warsaw Philharmonic, as it is formally known in English, or Orkiestra Filharmonii Narodowej w Warszawie (National Philharmonic Orchestra in Warsaw), as it is legally set up, is a Polish orchestra founded in 1901, one of the nation's oldest musical institutions. Its home is Warsaw Philharmonic Hall, or Filharmonia Narodowa w Warszawie.

History

The orchestra was conceived on initiative of an assembly of Polish aristocrats and financiers, as well as musicians. Between 1901 and the outbreak of World War II in 1939, several virtuoso- and conductor-composers regularly performed their works with the orchestra, including Edvard Grieg, Arthur Honegger, Ruggiero Leoncavallo, Sergei Prokofiev, Sergei Rachmaninoff, Maurice Ravel, Camille Saint-Saëns, Richard Strauss, and Igor Stravinsky. Among the other musicians who played with the Philharmonic were pianists Ignacy Jan Paderewski, Arthur Rubinstein, Vladimir Horowitz and Claudio Arrau, violinists Jascha Heifetz and Pablo de Sarasate, and cellist Pablo Casals. The Philharmonic has played host to the Chopin International Piano Competition since the contest began in 1927, and also appeared at the inaugural Wieniawski International Violin Competition (1935) and Universal Festival of Polish Art (1937).

The orchestra underwent an eclipse during the Second World War, during which it lost half its members to the war, as well as its elegant building, which had been erected and modeled after the Paris Opera around the start of the 20th century by Karol Kozłowski. In 1947, the orchestra resumed its regular season, but had to wait until 1955 for its home to be finally rebuilt, albeit in a new style. When the building was dedicated on 21 February, the Philharmonic was proclaimed the National Orchestra of Poland.

The conductor Witold Rowicki was responsible for helping modernize the ensemble and ensuring the orchestra cultivated Polish music both old and recent, as represented by the works of Frédéric Chopin, Henryk Górecki, and Witold Lutosławski, without failing also to refine its mastery of the world repertoire. At home, the orchestra performs in the Warsaw Autumn International Festival of Contemporary Music besides accompanying the final rounds of the Chopin International Piano Competitions, while abroad it has toured the five continents to critical acclaim.

The Philharmonic has recorded music for several anime series. Notable shows include Gankutsuou: The Count of Monte Cristo, Cowboy Bebop, Soukyuu no Fafner, Giant Robo: The Animation, Ah! My Goddess: The Movie, Princess Nine, Vision of Escaflowne, Wolf's Rain, Hellsing Ultimate, Genesis of Aquarion, and more recently, Fullmetal Alchemist: Brotherhood. It has also recorded music for Namco's Ace Combat 5: The Unsung War, and together with the Hollywood Session Orchestra, for the SEGA action-RPG Phantasy Star Universe. The orchestra was involved in a major performance for the film Avalon, composed by Kenji Kawai, and part of a performance is shown in the film. It also played the soundtrack for the film Battle Royale. Most recently, they have recorded music for the Square Enix role-playing video game Final Fantasy XIII.

List of musical directors
Emil Młynarski (1901–05)
Zygmunt Noskowski (1906–08)
Henryk Melcer-Szczawiński (1908–09)
Grzegorz Fitelberg (1909–11)
Zdzisław Birnbaum (1911–14, 1916–18)
Roman Chojnacki (1918–38)
Józef Ozimiński (1938–39)
Olgierd Straszyński (1945–46)
Andrzej Panufnik (1946–47)
Jan Maklakiewicz (1947–48)
Witold Rudziński (1948–49)
Władysław Raczkowski (1949–50)
Witold Rowicki (1950–55, 1958–77)
Bohdan Wodiczko (1955–58)
Kazimierz Kord (1977–2001), now Honorary Director
Antoni Wit (2002–2013)
Jacek Kaspszyk (2013–2019)
Andrey Boreyko (2019–present)

See also
Sinfonia Varsovia, (Warsaw)
National Forum of Music, (Wrocław)
NOSPR, (Katowice)
Music of Poland

References

History from the Orchestra's official website

External links

 Official website (in Polish and English)
 Official service of sale of tickets
  www.warszawa1939.pl The Warsaw Philharmonic edifice before the World War II.
 
 

Musical groups established in 1901
Polish orchestras
Tourist attractions in Warsaw
Symphony orchestras
1901 establishments in Poland